Tabriz–Urmia Freeway is a partially built freeway project in Northwestern Iran, East Azerbaijan and West Azerbaijan provinces, connecting the two cities of Tabriz and Urmia. It serves as a major link, with the bridge over Urmia Lake, connecting Urmia to the rest of the country via Tabriz and Freeway 2. The project consists of several segments.

Segment 1 connects the city of Urmia to the western shore of Urmia Lake. Segment 2 is the causeway and bridge over the lake. These two segment opened to traffic on 2017. Segment 3 is a segment through the mountainous Islami Island. This segment consists of a 2 km long twin tunnel, and is currently under construction. Segment 4 runs from the start of the swampy territory to the east of Islami Island, running mostly on an embankment, towards Tabriz–Maragheh Expressway. This segment opened to traffic on August 2019. Segment 5 connects the end of Segment 4 at Khaseban to Sahand, connecting to the Tabriz–Sahand Freeway Segment.

Tabriz–Sahand Freeway segment started several years before the finalization of the plans on how the end of Segment 4 will connect to the city of Tabriz, and initially it was not supposed to be part of the Freeway, as the freeway was planned to run on the west of the existing Tabriz–Maragheh Expressway to Tabriz Western Bypass Freeway. However, now this segment will constitute the last stretch of Freeway connecting the two cities.

Segment 6, also functioning as Tabriz Second Southern Bypass Freeway, planned to take over the function of Tabriz Southern Bypass Freeway will run from west to east. Its construction started on the Summer of 2019. It will also serve as a connector from Urmia towards Tehran, bypassing the city of Tabriz

Tabriz–Urmia Freeway

Tabriz–Sahand Freeway

Tabriz Second Southern Bypass Freeway

Freeways in Iran
Transport in Tabriz
Transport in Urmia
Transportation in East Azerbaijan Province
Transportation in West Azerbaijan Province